Lieke is a feminine Dutch given name. It is a pet form of Angelique. Notable people with the name include:

Lieke Klaus (born 1989), Dutch BMX racer
Lieke van Lexmond (born 1982), Dutch actress, model, presenter and singer
Lieke Martens (born 1992), Dutch football player

Dutch feminine given names